Washington Watch with Roland Martin is an American television news program hosted by Roland Martin and aired on TV One. The series began airing in 2009. In 2011, it was nominated for an Image Award for "Outstanding News, Talk, or Information Series." The show ended its four-year series run in May 2013.

References

External links
 

2009 American television series debuts
2013 American television series endings
2000s American television news shows
2010s American television news shows
Current affairs shows
English-language television shows
TV One (American TV channel) original programming